Ni Bowen (born 11 July 1998) is a Chinese badminton player. In 2016, she won the silver medal at the Asia Junior Championships in the girls' doubles event partnered with Zhou Chaomin. In 2017, she won her first international senior tournament at the Osaka International Challenge in the mixed doubles event partnered with Wang Sijie.

Achievements

Asian Junior Championships 
Girls' doubles

BWF International Challenge/Series 
Mixed doubles

  BWF International Challenge tournament
  BWF International Series tournament

References

External links 
 

1998 births
Living people
Badminton players from Zhejiang
Chinese female badminton players
21st-century Chinese women